Kevin Cobb is an American trumpet player who joined the American Brass Quintet in fall 1998. He also became a faculty member of The Juilliard School and the Aspen Music Festival. Currently, he teaches at the Yale School of Music and at SUNY Stony Brook.

Originally from Bowling Green, Ohio, his first solo appearance was at age fifteen with the Toledo Symphony. After attending Interlochen Arts Academy, he graduated with a Bachelor of Music degree from the Curtis Institute of Music, where he studied with Frank Kaderabek. He continued studies at The Juilliard School earning a Master of Music degree as a student of Mark Gould. Since his days at Curtis, Cobb has toured and performed in Asia, Central America and Europe, as well as in the United States. In New York, Cobb is regularly active with many of New York's top organizations. He can frequently be heard in radio and television commercials and has recorded over eight CDs with the ABQ alone. His first solo CD, One, released by Summit Records, has an all-American program of unaccompanied trumpet solos.

Performances and recordings
 One - (Summit Records)

References

American classical trumpeters
American male trumpeters
Aspen Music Festival and School faculty
Curtis Institute of Music alumni
Juilliard School alumni
Juilliard School faculty
Rutgers University faculty
Living people
University of Hartford Hartt School faculty
People from Bowling Green, Ohio
21st-century trumpeters
20th-century trumpeters
20th-century American male musicians
20th-century American musicians
21st-century American musicians
20th-century classical musicians
21st-century classical musicians
Classical musicians from Ohio
21st-century American male musicians
Year of birth missing (living people)
Summit Records artists